The group stage of the 2013 CECAFA Cup began on 27 November and ended on 5 December. The matchdays were 27–29 November, 30 November–2 December and 3–5 December.

The group stage featured 11 CECAFA associations and COSAFA member Zambia as the invited association. Teams were drawn into groups of four, where the top two teams from each group and the two best third-placed teams would advance to the knockout stage.

Group stage matches were scheduled to be held in Nairobi, Machakos and Nakuru.

Fixtures

Tiebreakers
The order of tie-breakers used when two or more teams have equal number of points is:

 Number of points obtained in games between the teams involved;
 Goal difference in games between the teams involved;
 Goals scored in games between the teams involved;
 Away goals scored in games between the teams involved;
 Goal difference in all games;
 Goals scored in all games;
 Drawing of lots.

Group A
Since Kenya and Ethiopia could not be separated using the tie-breaking criteria, a coin toss was used as the drawing of lots to determine the winner of Group A.

Group B

Group C

Third place qualification
In addition to the group stage winners and runners-up, the two best third-placed teams will be ranked at the end of the group stage to determine who will qualify for the knockout stage.

Top scorers (at the group stage)

3 goals

  Salah Ibrahim
  Festus Mbewe

2 goals

  Jockins Atudo
  Emmanuel Okwi
  Bornwell Mwape

1 goal

  Fiston Abdul Razak
  Christophe Nduwarugira
  Fasika Asfaw
  Saladin Bargecho
  Biruk Kalbore
  Yonatan Kebede
  Yussuf Saleh
  Jacob Keli
  David Owino
  Allan Wanga
  Michel Ndahinduka
  Richard Justin Lado
  Fabiano Lako
  Muhannad El Tahir
  Haruna Chanongo
  Said Morad
  Mbwana Samatta
  Khalid Aucho
  Hamis Kiiza
  Dan Sserunkuma
  Ronald Kampamba
  Awadh Juma Issa
  Abdi Kassim
  Adeyum Saleh

References

group stage